Lumberg may refer to:
 Lumberg (unit), an old and deprecated photometric unit of luminous energy
 Bill Lumbergh, fictional character in comedy film Office Space